Do Ab is the name of a rural area situated in the heart of Savadkuh County of Mazanderan province, Iran. It contains five villages. Sevatcow station on the Mazanderan branch of the trans-Iranian railway was built there during the rule of Reza Shah Pahlavi. Currently, train stops about 1 p.m. every day. It is about 7 kilometers south of Pol Sefid (Capital of township) and about 14 kilometers from Veresk Bridge.

External links

 Travel Post

Populated places in Mazandaran Province
Settled areas of Elburz